Tomasz Bajerski (born 9 September 1975 in Toruń, Poland) is a former motorcycle speedway rider from Poland.

Career  
Bajerski rode in  the 2003 Speedway Grand Prix. He was won Team Polish Champion title in 2001 and Individual U-21 Polish Champion titles in 1993 and 1996.

Speedway Grand Prix results

Results

World Championships 
 Individual World Championship (Speedway Grand Prix)
 2003 - 15th place (51 points)
 Individual U-21 World Championship
 1992 -  Pfaffenhofen - 11th place (6 points)
 1993 -  Pardubice - 7th place (8 points)
 1994 -  Elgane - 5th place (11 points)
 Team World Championship (Speedway World Cup)
 2003 -  Vojens - 4th place (6 points)

European Championships 
 European Club Champions' Cup
 2002 -  Pardubice - Bronze medal (7 points)

Polish competitions 
 Individual U-21 Polish Championship
 1993 -  Toruń - Polish Champion
 1996 -  Rzeszów - Polish Champion
 Team Polish Championship
 1992 - Bronze medal
 1993 - Bronze medal
 1994 - Bronze medal
 1995 - Runner-up
 1996 - Runner-up
 2000 - Bronze medal
 2001 - Polish Champion
 2003 - Runner-up
 Golden Helmet
 1995 -  Wrocław - Bronze medal
 1997 -  Wrocław - Runner-up
 Silver Helmet U-21
 1992 -  Grudziądz - Runner-up
 Bronze Helmet U-19
 1993 -  Tarnów - Runner-up

References

See also 
 Poland national speedway team
 List of Speedway Grand Prix riders

Polish speedway riders
1975 births
Living people
Sportspeople from Toruń
Oxford Cheetahs riders